Paul Nicholas (born Paul Oscar Beuselinck; 3 December 1944) is an English actor and singer. He started out with a pop career, but soon changed to musical theatre, playing the lead role in Jesus Christ Superstar at the West End’s Palace Theatre in 1972. Later, in the 1970s, he returned to the pop charts, and he began an acting career – starring in the 1983 BBC sitcom Just Good Friends, for which he is best known. The show won a BAFTA and Nicholas was also nominated for best comedy performance. After the show ended, he returned to musical theatre and various other entertainment roles, including producing and directing.  He is also known for his more recent television role in EastEnders as Gavin Sullivan.

Early life
Paul Nicholas was born Paul Oscar Beuselinck on 3 December 1944 in Peterborough. His paternal grandfather, Oscar Beuselinck, was Belgian and had been a chef in the merchant navy during World War II, before becoming head chef on the Union-Castle Line ships between the United Kingdom and South Africa. His maternal grandfather was a London docker.

The family spent holidays at his maternal grandparents' home on the Isle of Sheppey, until Nicholas was 10. After his parents divorced when he was 12, his father's family home was at Letchmore Heath, Hertfordshire, opposite the Bhaktivedanta Manor. His paternal grandparents, Winnie and Oscar, lived in a small cottage on the grounds.

Career

Nicholas began his pop career as early as 1960. Adopting the stage name Paul Dean, he formed Paul Dean & The Dreamers who were booked to support The Savages, the backing band for the British rocker Screaming Lord Sutch.

It was here that Sutch first noticed the young Nicholas, who was soon to become vocalist and pianist with The Savages. Still using the name Paul Dean, he released two solo singles in 1965–66. After taking a new stage name, Oscar, he began a long association with the Australian-born entrepreneur, Robert Stigwood. In 1966, Nicholas signed with Stigwood's Reaction Records label and his first single under his new name, "Club of Lights", scraped into the lower reaches of the Radio London Fab Forty chart.

The second Oscar single was a version of a Pete Townshend song "Join My Gang", which The Who never recorded. His third single, a novelty song called "Over the Wall We Go" (1967) is notable for being written and produced by a young David Bowie (Nicholas at this time was managing the band The Sweet and recommended them to record producer Phil Wainman whom he worked with at Mellin Music Publishing). After settling on the stage name Paul Nicholas, he found success in the UK in musicals, beginning with the leading role of Claude in Hair (which Stigwood produced) before winning the title role in the original London production of Jesus Christ Superstar. The part of Danny to Elaine Paige's Sandy made them the first British couple to play the leads in Grease.

He joined The Young Vic under Frank Dunlop and played Claudio in Much Ado About Nothing and appeared in Crete and Sgt. Pepper by John Antrobus. He appeared as the Bully of the Boulevard in Richard O’Brien’s T-Zee at London's Royal Court Theatre. He performed in Prospect Theatre Company's Carl Davies musical Pilgrim. While touring with O'Brien in Hair in 1970 he first heard songs from the yet to be produced Rocky Horror Show.

Nicholas' film career began in 1970 in Cannabis. He followed this with See No Evil (1971) and What Became of Jack and Jill? (1972). He then appeared in Stardust (1974), and Three for All (1975). In 1975, he played "Cousin Kevin", Tommy's vicious cousin, in Tommy, and portrayed Richard Wagner in Lisztomania (1975).

In 1976, he embarked on a short-lived but high-profile pop career, with three Top 20 hits in the UK Singles Chart "Reggae Like It Used To Be", "Dancing with the Captain", and "Grandma's Party", the last two of which reached the Top 10. He released the single "Heaven On The 7th Floor" in 1977. This only just reached the UK Top 40, but reached number No. 1 in New Zealand. In the US, the song peaked at No. 6 on the Billboard Hot 100 and number 5 in Cashbox listings, giving Nicholas a gold record. He followed this with "On The Strip" which entered the Billboard Hot 100 No. 67 but failed to enter the UK chart. In the mid-1970s he hosted his own children's television pop show, Paul.

In 1978, he appeared in Sgt. Pepper's Lonely Hearts Club Band as Dougie Shears. Further films followed including The World Is Full of Married Men (1979), Yesterday's Hero (1979), the loutish punk singer in The Jazz Singer (1980), the romantic lead in Invitation to the Wedding (1983), and Nutcracker (1983).

Having done a workshop with Andrew Lloyd Webber, he returned to West End theatre in 1981 to create the role of Rum Tum Tugger in Lloyd Webber's musical Cats. He then originated the title role in Blondel by Sir Tim Rice and Stephen Oliver. That same year, he starred in Two Up, Two Down, a short-lived sitcom co-starring Su Pollard. In 1983, he got his first high-profile television role as Vince Pinner in Just Good Friends. The show, for which Nicholas also sang the theme tune, was a success. He was also nominated for a BAFTA.

Nicholas later returned to the stage, playing numerous roles on screen in both movie and television projects. In 1986 Nicholas continued to star in musicals including ‘Jekyll and Hyde’’, Fiddler On The Roof’' and 42nd Street’' which was directed by the shows author Mark Bramble. He starred as The Pirate King in Joseph Papp's version of The Pirates of Penzance at the London Palladium and the Manchester Opera House, touring again in the same role in the late 1990s. He starred in Barnum in the first national tour and followed this with a highly successful season at The Dominion Theatre in the West End. At the end of 1991, while touring with Barnum, Nicholas was the subject of This Is Your Life. For his services to show business and charity, Nicholas was awarded a Silver Heart from the Variety Club of Great Britain and a Gold Badge Award from BASCA. Nicholas then starred in the national tour of Singin' in the Rain, which was directed by Tommy Steele.

In June 1996, Nicholas played the role of King Arthur in the Covent Garden Festival's production of Camelot. He repeated his role of King Arthur in a BBC Radio 2 production of Camelot. Other radio work included  Bert in BBC Radio 4's Gracie. He hosted two series of BBC Radio 2's Mad About Musical''', as well as his own hour-long TV special, Paul and Friends, for Thames Television. Nicholas fronted the Radio 4 children's series Cat's Whiskers during the 1980s.

In 1997, he starred as the anti-hero of Karoline Leach's The Mysterious Mr. Love at the Comedy Theatre in London's West End. He continued to appear as the lead in numerous straight roles thereafter: Simon Gray's Stagestruck, a national tour of Michael Cooney's The Dark Side, Catch Me if You Can, and two plays by Eric Chappell: Mixed Feelings, in which he played a transsexual, and Snakes and Ladders. He starred as John Smith in the original production of Caught in the Net. In 1998, he co-produced, with Bill Kenwright, a new musical based on Charles Dickens' novel A Tale of Two Cities, starring as Sidney Carton. The musical played Windsor with a Christmas season in Birmingham.

In 2000, Nicholas appeared in the BBC television comedy drama Sunburn, playing David Janus, owner of the self-titled holiday company around which the series was centered. He Ronnie Buchan in the new police drama series Burnside. Further television work included parts in The Bill and Holby City.

He then played the title role in the national tour of Doctor Dolittle and followed this with the role of Tevye in UK Productions' national tour of Fiddler on the Roof. In the summer of 2006, he was a celebrity showjumper in the BBC's Sport Relief event Only Fools on Horses, as well as appearing in Doctors, Heartbeat  and Holby City. That autumn, Nicholas was attached to star in the British film Cash and Curry, and that year he co-produced and starred in Jekyll & Hyde in a UK national tour.

In 2008, Nicholas played Alan Boon in BBC Four's Consuming Passions – a hundred years of Mills and Boon. He also directed and produced A Tale of Two Cities at Upstairs at the Gatehouse. In 2009, Nicholas played Jack Point in The Yeomen of the Guard for the Carl Rosa Opera Company at the Tower of London Festival. In November 2010, Nicholas opened in The Haunting. He also directed the musical version of Tale of Two Cities at Charing Cross Theatre in April–May 2012.

In 2014, Nicholas produced and starred in Blockbuster, a musical. In 2015, he appeared as Judge Wargrave in And Then There Were None. In the summer of 2015 he directed a new production of Tommy at Blackpool's Opera House. In June 2015 while touring in And Then There Were None, Nicholas was cast as Gavin Sullivan on EastEnders. He then starred as Scrooge in the Alan Menken musical, A Christmas Carol. In 2016, he was cast as Neville Chamberlain in the film Masaryk. He appeared as himself in The Real Marigold Hotel shown on BBC One in March 2017.In 2018 Nicholas toured the UK. In 2018 toured Ronald Harwood’s’’Quartet’In 2019 Nicholas played Father Merrin in the ‘Exorcist’.In 2021 Nicholas published ‘Musicals Marigolds & Me’and his 3 CD Boxset ‘Paul Nicholas Gold’.In 2022 he played Pickering in ‘Pygmalion’ at the Theatre Royal Windsor. 

In 2023 Nicholas resumed a UK tour of ‘The Best Exotic Marigold Hotel’ prior to a West End run. He also released an audio book of his biography ‘Musicals Marigolds & Me’

Business
In 1990, while starring with David Ian in The Pirates of Penzance at the London Palladium, Nicholas offered Ian a partnership in co-producing and starring in a touring production of the New York Shakespeare Festival version of the popular Gilbert and Sullivan opera. Paul Nicholas & David Ian Associates Ltd was formed to produce the 20th anniversary production of Jesus Christ Superstar on a UK-wide tour, which sold out. They then produced a nightly fully staged version of The Pirates of Penzance in which Nicholas starred and again they sold out.

The company has since produced numerous shows, including:Jesus Christ Superstar – concert version 	Pirates of Penzance – UK tourGrease – West End and Broadway – Tony Award nomination for Best Revival 2008The Rocky Horror Show – directorAin't Misbehavin' – West EndSingin' in the Rain – UK tourEvita – UK tourChess – UK tourHappy Days – UK tourSaturday Night Fever – London Palladium and NYC Minskoff Theatre, co-adapter and producerA Tale of Two Cities – UK tour; co-produced with Bill Kenwright 	Jekyll & Hyde – UK tour, co-produced with UK ProductionsKeeler – 2007, producer and directorA Tale of Two Cities – Upstairs at The Gatehouse 2008, producer and directorGrease – West End 2007 and US tour 2008–09, co-producerJest End (musical parody) – London Players and Jermyn Theatres 2009, producerGrease – South Africa and Far East tour 2010, US and UK tours 2010/11, co-producer
Keeler – UK tour September–November 2011, producer and director
A Tale of Two Cities: The Musical – Charing Cross Theatre April–May 2012, director  Seven Brides for Seven Brothers – UK tour September 2013, producer 	Wag – Charing Cross Theatre July 2013, co-producerKeeler – October 2013 producer and director 	Blockbuster – UK tour September 2014 producer and director 	A Christmas Carol – 2015 associate producerGrease – UK tour 2017, co-producer
‘’Tommy’’ - Blackpool Opera House,2018 Director

Paul Nicholas School of Acting & Performing Arts

In 2006 Nicholas set up a franchise operation, the Paul Nicholas School of Acting & Performing Arts, aimed at teaching acting to school-age children. The company went into liquidation in 2012. In January 2008 Nicholas launched Paul Nicholas Community Arts, a project designed to engage disenfranchised children in the arts. The pilot scheme was funded for fourteen weeks by Wyre Borough Council. A twelve-week scheme began on 28 May 2008 in Blackpool. 

 Filmography 

Personal life
Nicholas was 18 when he had a child, Carl (b. 1965), with girlfriend Patricia Brecknell. His then-former girlfriend, Lyn Last, gave birth to his second child, Jason (b. 1967), only a few months after his 1966 marriage to Susan Gee. Nicholas and Gee had two children together, Natasha (b. 1969) and Oscar (b. 1971). After their divorce, Susan Gee died in 1977, at the age of 28 in a car accident, survived by their two young children.

Nicholas first met Linzi Jennings in 1970; they later dated and were in a relationship until 1977.

Nicholas became despondent in 1979; the mother of his two children, Susan Gee had died and he was a single parent. Through his grief he was reunited with Linzi a few months later, she was supportive of him and his two children, gelling as a family unit, they went on to have two children together, Alex (b. 1981) and Carmen (b. 1987). Nicholas and Linzi married in 1984.

Discography
Albums
Appearances:
Hair (Original London Cast Recording) (1968, Polydor Records)Fresh Hair (Original London Cast Recording) (1970, Polydor)
Cats (Original London Cast Recording) (1981, Polydor)
Sgt. Pepper's Lonely Hearts Club Band (soundtrack) (1978, RSO Records)
Solo:Paul Nicholas (1977, RSO LP) 12 songs; 10 in the US and Canada. In the Netherlands, it was retitled On the Strip (1978, RSO LP) and added two single A-sides while dropping two others.Just Good Friends (1986, K-Tel LP and CD) 13 songs, 12 of which are cover versionsThat's Entertainment (1993, Karussell CD) 14-song compilation; RSO/Polydor material from 1976 to 1980Colours of My Life (1994, First Night Records CD) 16-song compilation; 12 from West End theatre cast albums and 4 new recordings

Singles

Literature

Paul Nicholas (with Douglas Thompson) "Musicals, Marigolds & Me" autobiography, 235 pages. Published in October 2021 by Fantom Publishing.
Paul Nicholas (with Douglas Thompson): Behind the Smile'' autobiography, hardcover, 218 pages published in October 1999 by André Deutsch Ltd;

See also
List of one-hit wonders in the United States
Paul Nicholas Gold Album 
Demon Records October 2021

 Paul Nicholas Album’On The Strip’2022 Paul Nicholas Album ‘Rarities’2022

References

External links

Paul Nicholas at the British Film Institute

Paul Nicholas at Theatricalia

1944 births
English male singers
English male soap opera actors
English male stage actors
English people of Belgian descent
Living people
Male actors from Cambridgeshire
Musicians from Cambridgeshire
People from Peterborough
RSO Records artists
British male comedy actors
Screaming Lord Sutch and the Savages members